Gurgen Vazgen Engibaryan (born 19 March 1964) is a former footballer who played as a midfielder.

Born in the Armenian SSR, in the Soviet Union, Engibaryan moved to Lebanon in 1993, acquiring Lebanese nationality through naturalization in 1995. He represented Lebanon since then, playing at the 2000 AFC Asian Cup.

Club career 
Born in the Armenian SSR, Soviet Union, he started his club career in Armenia at Olympia Ashtarak, before moving to Kotayk and then Ararat Yerevan, where he played over 100 league matches. In 1995 he moved to Lebanon, playing for Homenmen; he moved to Tadamon Sour in 2000, ending his career three years later.

International career 
Engibaryan acquired Lebanese nationality to be able to play for the Lebanon national team, playing in the 2000 AFC Asian Cup. He represented Lebanon between 1995 and 2001, scoring once.

Honours 
Aratat Yerevan
 Armenian Premier League: 1993
 Armenian Cup: 1993

Homenmen
 Lebanese Elite Cup: 1999
 Lebanese FA Cup runner-up: 1997–98, 1998–99
 Lebanese Super Cup runner-up: 1999

Tadamon Sour
 Lebanese FA Cup: 2000–01

Individual
 Lebanese Premier League Team of the Season: 1996–97, 1997–98, 2000–01, 2001–02

See also 
 List of Lebanon international footballers born outside Lebanon

Notes

References

External links 
 
 
 
 
 Gurgen Engibaryan at 11v11.com

Living people
1964 births
Soviet footballers
Armenian footballers
Lebanese footballers
Soviet Armenians
Armenian emigrants to Lebanon
Naturalized citizens of Lebanon
Association football midfielders
FC Ararat Yerevan players
FC Lernagorts Kapan players
FC Kotayk Abovyan players
Homenmen Beirut players
Tadamon Sour SC players
Soviet First League players
Soviet Top League players
Armenian Premier League players
Lebanese Premier League players
Lebanon international footballers
2000 AFC Asian Cup players